John T. Kewish was born in 1868 in Smithtown, NY and was the principal creator of the primer actuated blowback machine gun in 1918 which is covered by U.S. patent no. 1,472,126. John C. Garand was assigned 25% as co-inventor. Kewish was also a contributor to several later automatic firearm developments. He died March 1, 1945, in New York, NY.

Patents
Patents include:
US1472126 - Filed Jul 09, 1918 - Issued Oct 30, 1923 "Machine Gun"
US1502676 - Filed Sep 14, 1920 - Issued Jul 29, 1924 "Automatic Rifle"
US1587003 - Filed Sep 07, 1921 - Issued Jun 01, 1926 "Automatic Firearm"
US1563751 - Filed May 31, 1924 - Issued Dec 01, 1925 "Automatic Firearm"
US1696537 - Filed Apr 13, 1927 - Issued Dec 25, 1928 "Automatic Firearm"
US1993887 - Filed Apr 16, 1932 - Issued Mar 12, 1935 "Automatic Firearm"

See also
 Blowback (firearms)

References

Roach W. N. (1924). Recent Patents – Brief Descriptions of Inventions of Interest to Ordnance Engineers.  Army Ordnance – The Journal of the Army Ordnance Association, IV(23), 347.

External links
 List of Kewish U.S. patents
 Army Ordnance (1924), IV(23), pg 347.

1868 births
1945 deaths
Firearm designers